American singer Lea Michele has released four studio albums, three singles, seven promotional singles, and three music videos. Michele came to prominence for her role as Rachel Berry on the television series Glee, where she established her musical career performing on the series' soundtrack albums. Prior to this, she was known for her Broadway soundtrack credits.

In 2012, Michele signed a record deal with Columbia. She began recording for her debut album on October 19, 2012. On November 27, 2013, Michele announced that the first single from her debut album, Louder, would be "Cannonball", which debuted at number 75 on the Billboard Hot 100, selling over 51,000 copies in its first week of sale. The accompanying music video was released on January 9, 2014. Four songs were also released as promotional singles in the lead-up to the album: "Battlefield", "Louder", "What Is Love?", and "You're Mine". The album, which was released on March 4, 2014, made its debut on the Billboard 200 at number 4, selling over 62,000 copies in its first week. Michele's second single, "On My Way", was released on May 4, 2014, with its music video premiering on May 19, 2014.

On March 3, 2017, Michele released "Love Is Alive" as the first single from her second studio album, Places. Three songs were also released as promotional singles in the lead-up to the album: "Anything's Possible", "Run to You", and "Getaway Car". The album, which was released on April 28, 2017, debuted at number 28 on the Billboard 200, selling over 16,000 copies in its first week.

On October 25, 2019, Michele released her third studio album, Christmas in the City. The album is her first Christmas album.

Michele released her fourth studio album, Forever, on November 5, 2021.

Albums

Studio albums

Soundtrack albums

Singles

As lead artist

As featured artist

Promotional singles

Other charted songs

Guest appearances

Music videos

Notes

References

External links
 
 

Discographies of American artists
Glee discographies
Discography
Pop music discographies